The Environment, Resources and Development Court (ERD Court) is a specialist court in the Australian state of South Australia. It deals with disputes and enforcement of laws relating to the development and management of land, the natural and built environment and natural resources. It was established by the Environment, Resources and Development Court Act 1993.

The ERD Court has jurisdiction under legislation relating to the natural and built environment, heritage, water, native title and mining. The senior judge and other judges of the ERD Court are judges in the District Court of South Australia. Masters of the court are also designated from the District Court. The court also has magistrates (drawn from the Magistrates Court of South Australia) and commissioners who are not lawyers, but are experts in fields relevant to the court.

References

South Australian courts and tribunals